Maksim Aleksandrovich Belyayev (born 30 September 1991) is a Russian professional footballer. He plays as a centre-back for Arsenal Tula.

Club career
He made his debut in the Russian Premier League for FC Lokomotiv Moscow on 19 July 2009 when he replaced Dmitry Sennikov during the game against FC Amkar Perm.

After leaving Arsenal Tula as a free agent at the end of the 2020–21 season and missing the first 6 games of the 2021–22 Russian Premier League, he returned to Arsenal on 6 September 2021 and signed a new two-year contract with the club.

International
On 11 March 2019, he was called up to the Russia national football team for the Euro 2020 qualifiers against Belgium on 21 March 2019 and Kazakhstan on 24 March 2019.

He made his debut for the team on 19 November 2019 in a UEFA Euro 2020 qualifier against San Marino.

Career statistics

Club

Notes

References

External links
 
 
 

1991 births
People from Ozyory, Moscow Oblast
Living people
Russian footballers
Russia youth international footballers
Russia under-21 international footballers
Russia international footballers
Association football defenders
FC Lokomotiv Moscow players
FC Dynamo Bryansk players
FC Torpedo Vladimir players
FC Rostov players
FC Shinnik Yaroslavl players
FC Arsenal Tula players
Russian Premier League players
Russian First League players
Sportspeople from Moscow Oblast